The 2018 Copa Constitució was the 26th version of the national football knockout tournament involving clubs from Andorra. The cup began on 21 January 2018 and ended on 20 May 2018 with the final. The winners of the cup earned a place in the 2018–19 Europa League and would have joined the competition in the preliminary round.

UE Santa Coloma were the defending champions having won the cup in the previous season by defeating FC Santa Coloma in the final by a score of 1–0.

Format
The 2018 Copa Constitució was contested by twelve clubs.

Schedule

First round
Eight clubs competed in the first round. The matches were played on 21 January 2018.

|}

Quarter-finals
Eight clubs competed in the quarter-finals. The matches were played on 14 March 2018.

|}

Semifinals
Four clubs competed in the semifinals. The matches were played on 4 April 2018.

|}

Final
The cup final was played on 20 May 2018.

See also
2017–18 Primera Divisió
2017–18 Segona Divisió

External links
UEFA

References

Andorra
Cup
2018